Junkers A 35 was a two-seater cantilever monoplane, used for postal, training and military purposes. The aircraft was designed in the 1920s by Junkers in Germany and manufactured at Dessau and by AB Flygindustri in Limhamn, Sweden and conversions from A 20s were made in Fili, Russia.

Design and development
The A 35 was a development of a series of Junkers aircraft from 1918, starting with the J10/J11, the A 20, A 25, A 32, and finally the A 35. It was originally intended as a two-seat multi-purpose fighter aircraft and made its first flight in 1926. Due to the post-war restrictions, Hugo Junkers and the Soviet Government signed a contract about the setup of an aircraft facility at Fili in Russia in December 1922.

In 1926, the first Junkers L5 engines were mounted on the Junkers A 20s. With some further tail modifications the new aircraft was designated as A 35. A total of 24 aircraft were originally built as A 35s. A number of A 20s and A 25s were also modified with the Junkers L5 engine. The A 35 was also available with a BMW IV engine.

Versions
Junkers A 20
 The version manufactured in Limhamn was called R02 and the version manufactured in Fili was called  Ju 20
Junkers A 20L
Landplane version.
Junkers A 20W
Floatplane version.
Junkers A 25
 The version manufactured in Limhamn was called R41 and the version manufactured in Fili was called  Type A
Junkers A 35
 The militarized version manufactured in Limhamn was called K53/R53 and the version manufactured in Fili was called  Type 20.
The Junkers R53 was first built as in 1926 as a military version of the Junkers A35.  It was equipped with a Junkers L5 engine and a machine gun over the rear seat by AB Flygindustri in Limhamn and this version was designated as the Junkers/AFI R53.  It was sold to different countries from Sweden to avoid the restrictions of the Treaty of Versailles. Most of these R53 were converted Junkers A35 or A20 civil aircraft, which had been built at Dessau. Some were delivered to Turkey as modified A20s, a further 20 aircraft went to Russia and 21 militarized R53 were sold to China.

Operators

Afghan Air Force

Bulgarian Air Force

Chilean Air Force
 21 K53 aircraft were sold to Chinese warlords, 10 to Zhang Zongchang of Shandong, 9 to Zhang Xueliang of Manchuria, 1 to Yan Xishan of Shanxi, 1 sold to Liu Xiang of Sichuan.

Finnish Air Force – One aircraft only. Tested for three weeks in 1928.

Reichswehr

Royal Hungarian Air Force

Imperial Iranian Air Force
 Spanish Republic

Soviet Air Force – 20 Ju-20 (militarized A 20) aircraft

Turkish Air Force – 64 A20 aircraft,  Together with the Turkish Government Junkers set up a factory at Kayseri under the name TOMTAŞ. At this factory the delivered A20 aircraft, modified to A35's, were militarized with machine guns and bomb slots.

Specifications (A 35)

See also

References

Bibliography
 Andersson, Lennart. "Chinese 'Junks': Junkers Aircraft Exports to China 1925-1940". Air Enthusiast, No. 55, Autumn 1994, pp. 2–7.

External links

 Junkers K 53 article in German with photo

1920s German military trainer aircraft
A 35